Haiderganj is a town in Bikapur tehsil in Faizabad district  (officially Ayodhya district) of Uttar Pradesh state of India. Haiderganj is 40 km south of district headquarters Ayodhya city.

Now there is a big market, shopping centres, automobile agencies, community health center, government hospital, many clinics, many bank branches like branch of Canara Bank, & Bank of Baroda, ATM, schools, colleges and petrol pumps in Haiderganj, Ayodhya.

Civic administration 

There is a police station (Thana) in Haiderganj.  Haiderganj is a part of Tarun block in Ayodhya, Uttar Pradesh.

Politics 
Haiderganj is a part of Goshainganj Vidhan Sabha constituency and Ambedkar Nagar Lok Sabha constituency. Abhay Singh from Samajwadi Party is an MLA of Goshainganj Vidhan Sabha constituency in Uttar Pradesh, India. And Ritesh Pandey from BSP is an MP of Ambedkar Nagar Lok Sabha constituency in Uttar Pradesh state, India.

Transport

By Road
Haiderganj is well connected with nearby cities and towns due to good road connectivity. Faizabad (41 km), Ayodhya (40 km), Sultanpur (32 km), Akbarpur (35 km), Pratapgarh (73 km), Barabanki (130 km) and Basti (85 km) are the nearby cities connected well with Haiderganj.

Bhiti (7 km), Tarun (10 km), Fulauna (11 km), Chaure Bazar (12 km), Kurebhar (13 km), Semari (15 km), Goshainganj (20 km), Bikapur (21 km), Maharua (21 km), Bhadarsa, Masodha, Kumarganj, Milkipur, Maya Bazar, Pura Bazar, Raunahi, Sohawal, Rudauli, Mawai are the nearby towns connected very well with Haiderganj.

By Train
Chaure Bazar, Goshainganj, Faizabad Junction (Ayodhya Cantt Junction), Bharatkund, Ayodhya Junction, Rudauli, Sohawal, Kurebhar, Akbarpur Junction, and Sultanpur Junction are the nearby railway stations from Haiderganj, Ayodhya.

By Air
Ayodhya Airport is the nearest airport from Haiderganj.  And Chaudhary Charan Singh Airport (Lucknow) and Allahabad Airport are the nearby airports to reach Haiderganj, Ayodhya.

Education 
 Kalpana Shikshan Prashikshan P.G. College, Sarai Manodhar, Haiderganj
 Surya Public School
 RKT Public School
 Sumitra Balika Inter College
 P.D. Public Junior High School, Malawan, Haiderganj 
 Shri Baijnath Shivkala Mahavidyalaya, Haiderganj

See also 
 Nandigram (Bharat Kund)
 Dr. Bhimrao Ambedkar International Sports Stadium

References

Villages in Faizabad district